George Ackerman Abert (October 22, 1840March 27, 1918) was an American manufacturer, businessman, and Democratic politician. He was a member of the Wisconsin State Senate and Assembly, representing Milwaukee.

Early life
Abert was born on October 22, 1840, in Milwaukee, Wisconsin, the first of eight children born to Louisa (née Ackerman; 1818–1889), a native of Bavaria, and George Abert Sr. (1817–1890), a native of Alsace, France. He attended the common schools in the area. He was an iron founder and machine manufacturer by trade.

Political career
Abert served as a Democratic member of the State Senate from 1877 to 1878. In 1879, he was the city commissioner of public works. He was a member of the State Assembly twice, serving from 1882 to 1883 and from 1893 to 1894.

References

Politicians from Milwaukee
Democratic Party Wisconsin state senators
Democratic Party members of the Wisconsin State Assembly
Businesspeople from Wisconsin
1840 births
1918 deaths
19th-century American businesspeople
American people of French descent